Heart over Mind is the third studio album by American singer Jennifer Rush. It was released in 1987.

Background
With her first two albums being recorded in Germany and Rush experiencing much success in Europe, she decided to relocate to the US for her next album. Working with writers and producers such as Harold Faltermeyer and Michael Bolton, this album would go on to be one of the most successful of Rush's career.

Released in early 1987, the first single was the European hit "I Come Undone". However it was the second single release which the record company were more excited about – "Flames of Paradise", a duet with Elton John. The song became Rush's first top 40 success in the US as well as a hit in Europe, although smaller than expected in the UK, after predictions of it reaching number one by both Smash Hits and Number One Magazines. The album itself boasted a host of power ballads and uptempo pop/rock tunes with high production values and went on to reach number one in Germany for 9 weeks, remaining on the chart for over a year. It also reached number one in Switzerland. In the US the album peaked at number 118 and number 48 in the UK. A third single "Heart Over Mind" duly became another hit in Europe and also hit the US Club Chart, peaking at No.33.

Track listing
Writers in the 'Music' column are the same as those in the 'Lyrics' column unless otherwise stated.

Personnel
Guitars: Richie Sambora (1), John Putnum (2, 7), Dann Huff (3-4, 6), J.J. Belle (5), Paul Jackson (5, 9), Jim Ryan (8), Tim Renwick (10)
Keyboards: Robbie Kondor (1-2), Al Greenwood (1-2), Harold Faltermeyer (3-4, 6), Greg Phillinganes (5), Robbie Kilgore (5, 9), Greg Mangafico (7), Charlie Roth (7), Richard Cottle (10)
Bass: John Seigle (1), Seth Glassman (2, 7), Nathan East (5), Leland Sklar (8), Richard Cottle (10)
Drums: Michael Braun (1-2), John Robinson (5, 8-9), Anton Fig (7), Russ Kunkel (8), Jimmy Bralower (8), Graham Broad (10)
Percussion: Savron Hudson (1-2), Jimmy Maelen (5, 8), Anton Fig (7)
Saxophone: Bobby Stern (2), Richard Cottle (10)
Background vocals: Jennifer Rush (1-3, 5-6, 8, 10), Diana Grasselli (1-2), Ellen Shipley (1-2), Myriam Valle (1-2), Desmond Child (2), David Dale (2), Siedah Garrett (3, 6), Edie Lehmann (3, 6), Beth Anderson (3, 6), Joe Pizzulo (3, 6), Darryl Phinnessee (3, 6), Jon Joyce (3, 6), Elton John (5), Gordon Grody (5), Bruce Roberts (5, 8-9), Andy Goldmark (9), Alan Carvell (10), Andy Brown (10), Anne Turner (10)

Charts

Weekly charts

Year-end charts

Certifications

Release history

References

External links

1987 albums
Albums produced by Desmond Child
Albums produced by Gus Dudgeon
Albums produced by Harold Faltermeyer
CBS Records albums
Jennifer Rush albums